Byesville Scenic Railway  is a tourist railroad located in Byesville, Ohio. Service was suspended in 2011, and as of late 2021 has not resumed.  

The railway is a non-profit group dedicated to preserving the local coal mining and railroad history in Guernsey County, Ohio, United States.  The railroad runs on track that was originally known as the Cleveland & Marietta Railroad and later became part of the Pennsylvania Railroad.  The primary freight hauled was coal, as Guernsey County was a large producer of coal.  It later became part of the Penn Central Railroad due to a merger of the Pennsylvania and New York Central and later Conrail.

In the early 1980s most of the C&M was removed, the remaining portion from Cambridge to C&M Junction (just south of Derwent) was sold to the Chessie System (which later became CSX Transportation).  Guernsey County purchased Byesville to C&M Junction in 1999 which lay dormant until 2003 when the Buckeye Central Scenic Railroad began operating a tourist train from Byesville, Ohio to Derwent.  In 2006, the newly formed Byesville Scenic Railway (BSRW) began operations and has continued the rehabilitation of line to C&M Junction.  BSRW plans call for the rebuilding the old B&O Eastern Ohio branch to Cumberland, Ohio

References

External links
Byesville Scenic Railway

Transportation in Guernsey County, Ohio
Heritage railroads in Ohio
Tourist attractions in Guernsey County, Ohio